The Superisligaen, known as the Metal Ligaen for sponsorship reasons, is the highest-level ice hockey league in Denmark. The league consists of 9 professional teams.

Teams from the Superisligaen can participate in the IIHF's annual Champions Hockey League (CHL), competing for the European Trophy. Participation is based on the strength of the various leagues in Europe (excluding the European/Asian Kontinental Hockey League). Going into the 2022–23 CHL season, the Superisligaen was ranked the No. 13 league in Europe, allowing them to send their top team to compete in the CHL.

History 
The Danish Ice hockey league has become a springboard for foreign players and a place to start their European careers, before traveling to other bigger leagues such as the Swedish Hockey League or DEL. The teams rely mostly on foreign talent, but there is still a lot of skilled professional Danish players. It is mostly the older Danish players, who are full-time professional. Most younger players are semi-professional because of the tight economy in Danish hockey and most of the money is spent on more talented foreign players.

In the past, the league has consisted of as many as 10 teams. Despite the introduction of a salary cap as well as a limit to the number of import players allowed, several teams have struggled financially in recent years. As a result, the Herlev Hornets and the Rungsted Cobras have withdrawn from the league, reducing the number of active teams from 10 to 8. Teams from the second-tier league were offered the empty spots, but no team were able to accept the offer, citing financial issues as their main concern.

On 9 January 2015 TV2 Sport debuted as a new sports channel on Danish TV. Same day, HockeyNight also aired for the first time, with a match between Odense Bulldogs and Rungsted. Since 2015 TV2 Sport has been the place to watch icehockey and other sports.

On 18 June 2016 it was made clear that the foreign player limit of 8, was against EU law and it was therefore removed. The 2016–17 season was the first time, since 2009, that a Danish ice hockey team could have an unlimited number of foreign players. The salary cap was created to regulating the league. The salary cap of the 2016–17 season, was 6 million DKK.

On June 3, Metal Ligaen was expanded once again, to an historic number of 11 teams. Hvidovre Fighters, who had previously left the league in 2013 because of bankruptcy, got their submitted papers approved, making them the 11th team of the 2017/18 season.

League format 
The league consists of 9 teams. The latest expansion was in 2014, when Gentofte Stars joined the league after being relegated in 1999. The league format has changed many times. The current structure was implemented in the 2011–12 season. Often it is changed depending on how many teams that are represented in the league. There has never been more than 10 teams in the Danish ice hockey league, making it fairly small structured league compared to other leagues in Europe.

The Danish hockey league is structured so that every team meet 5 times, making the seasons after 2014, 45 games long. The season typically starts in September and ends in February. The top 8 teams of the regular season makes the playoffs. First place gets to pick who they want to play in the quarterfinals. second place pick next and so on. The Metal Ligaen playoffs consists of 3 rounds: quarterfinals, semifinals and the finals. The winner will raise The Prince Henrik's Cup.

As of the 2017/18 Metal Ligaen expansion, the Metal Ligaen regular season was extended from 45 games to a historic 50 games. The playoff format was also changed, where previously the top 8 teams made the playoffs. Now the top 6 teams advanced directly to the Quarterfinals and teams ranking from 7 to 10 would play for the last two wildcard spots.

Metal Cup 

The Metal Cup is a tournament held every year. It consists of 12 teams, where all Metal Ligaen teams are represented. Two teams from the 1.division are also represented. The top 4 teams the year before will go straight to the quarterfinals. The 8 other teams will by draw be divided into 4 groups each one of them with a letter from A to D. 4 teams will advance on from first round to the quarterfinals. In the quarterfinals the last seasons champs will play winner of group A. second-place winner of group B and so on. games in the quarterfinals and semifinals consists of two games. The winner of the tournament will receive the Metal Cup.

In 2017, the Metal Cup format was changed. Because of Hvidovre Fighters joining the league, the format would now only consist of teams from the Metal Ligaen and, instead of a playout format, the top 4 teams after 20 regular season games would be invited to a final four tournament.

Names and sponsorship
The Danish Ice Hockey Union officially recognizes the league as the Superisligaen.  Through the years, the naming rights of the league has been leased to a series of sponsors, resulting in numerous name changes.

Teams

Notable players 
List of notable players who have played in the Danish icehockey league.

Danish Champions

By club

References

External links
League website

 
Professional ice hockey leagues in Denmark
Top tier ice hockey leagues in Europe